Chester is a census-designated place and unincorporated community in Major County, Oklahoma, United States. The post office opened April 8, 1895; the ZIP Code is 73838. It is said to have been named for Chester I. Long, U.S. Senator from Kansas.

Demographics

Notable person
Hurshul Clothier, musician

References

Shirk, George H. Oklahoma Place Names. Norman: University of Oklahoma Press, 1987. .

Census-designated places in Oklahoma
Unincorporated communities in Major County, Oklahoma
Unincorporated communities in Oklahoma